Sam Raphling (March 19, 1910, Fort Worth, Texas - January 8, 1988, New York City) was an American composer and pianist. He studied under Artur Schnabel at the University of Michigan.He wrote in a variety of musical genres, including orchestral works, chamber pieces, and vocal art songs; the latter of which remain his most notable legacy. Also of note is his orchestral suite Dance of the Chassidic and his piano arrangement of The Rite of Spring. He wrote two children's operas with librettist James V. Hatch. As a pianist he made a number of recording on the RCA Victor label.

External links
Interview with Sam Raphling, September 6, 1986
Anne Rutledge words by Edgar Lee Masters; music for voice and piano by Sam Raphling. From the Library of Congress

1910 births
1988 deaths
20th-century classical composers
20th-century classical pianists
American classical composers
American classical pianists
American male pianists
American male classical composers
American opera composers
Male opera composers
University of Michigan School of Music, Theatre & Dance alumni
20th-century American pianists
20th-century American composers
20th-century American male musicians